Njord is the third studio album by the German/Norwegian symphonic metal band Leaves' Eyes, released on 28 August 2009 on Napalm Records. Njörðr comes from Norse mythology and is a name associated to the Vanir god of the sea and the wind.

In this album the band used for the first time a full orchestra and choir and wrote for them suitable arrangements.

The album was also released in a digipak deluxe edition, including two bonus tracks and a model of a Viking longship with Leaves' Eyes logo on the sail.

Track listing

Personnel

Leaves' Eyes
Liv Kristine Espenæs – vocals
Alexander Krull – vocals, keyboards, programming, samples
Thorsten Bauer – guitars, bass
Mathias Röderer – guitars
Alla Fedynitch – bass (credited, but does not appear on the album)
Seven Antonopoulos – drums

Additional musicians
Lingua Mortis Orchestra from Minsk, Belarus, directed by Victor Smolski
Al dente Choir from Kleinbottwar, Germany, directed by Veronika Messmer
Christian Roch - Uilleann pipes and whistles on "Scarborough Fair" and "Irish Rain"
Anette Gulbrandsen - backing vocals on "Northbound"
Gunnar Sauermann, Cristoph Sutzer, Robert Suß, Uwe Fichtner, Markus Rutten, Steven Willems, Stefan Heilemann - Vikings on "Njord"

Production
Alexander Krull - producer, engineer, mixing and mastering at Mastersound Studios
Mathias Röderer, Thorsten Bauer - assistant engineers
Victor Smolski - orchestra recording engineer

Charts

Release history

References

2009 albums
Leaves' Eyes albums
Napalm Records albums
Albums produced by Alexander Krull